Cha Cha Damore is the third album by Pegboy. It was released on October 14, 1997, through Quarterstick Records.

Critical reception
Ox-Fanzine wrote that "the Pegboy variant of melodic guitar punk deliberately aims to avoid catchy tralala schemes." The Wisconsin State Journal wrote that "on each successive recording, the Chicago band's upbeat, elemental pop punk rock sounds ever more invigorating." The Chicago Reader called Cha Cha Damore the band's best album.

Track listing

Personnel 
Pegboy
Larry Damore – vocals
Joe Haggerty – drums
John Haggerty – guitar
Pierre Kezdy – bass guitar
Production and additional personnel
Steve Albini – production, engineering

References

External links 
 

1997 albums
Albums produced by Steve Albini
Quarterstick Records albums
Pegboy albums